Bakersfield High School (BHS) is a public four-year high school located in Bakersfield, California, United States. Opened in 1893, Bakersfield High School serves grades ninth through twelfth within the Kern High School District.

Notable alumni

 Larry Barnes – former MLB player (Anaheim Angels, Los Angeles Dodgers).
 Theo Bell – former NFL football player
 Jeff Buckey – former NFL football player
 Johnny Callison - former Major League Baseball outfielder
 Pete Cross – former NBA player.
 Marion Osborn Cunningham – artist. 
 Ric Drasin – actor, author, designer of the Gold's Gym and World Gym logos, and retired professional wrestler
 Robert Duncan – poet, was a key figure in the San Francisco Renaissance
 Frank Gifford – Pro Football Hall of Fame and Monday Night Football commentator 
 Merle Haggard – singer-songwriter.
 Jerry Marion – former NFL player
 Kevin McCarthy – Congressman
 Matthew Todd Miller, American citizen held by North Korea
 Spain Musgrove – former NFL defensive lineman
 Doug Loman – former MLB player (Milwaukee Brewers)
 Ruth B. Love (Class of 1950) – Educator, former education administrator, school superintendent and author. Love is noted as the first African–American and woman to serve as superintendent of Chicago Public Schools, the nation's third largest school district.
 Steve Ontiveros – former MLB player (San Francisco Giants, Chicago Cubs)
 Dennis Ralston – Davis Cup winner
 Don Robesky – former Stanford football player
 Jeff Siemon – former NFL football player
 Jeremy Staat – former NFL player
 Michael Stewart – former NFL football player
 Robert Swift – former NBA player
 Phillip Thomas – former NFL football player
 Jake Varner – four time All-American and two time national champion wrestler at Iowa State University and winner of a gold medal at the 2012 Olympic Games in London at 26
 Tyrone Wallace (Class of 2012) – Paris basketball player, NBA player, former California Golden Bears basketball player
 Earl Warren  – California Attorney General, three-term Governor of California, Chief Justice of the United States, and chairman of the Warren Commission
 Larry Welz – noteworthy early contributor to underground comics movement

 Jarrett Brannen (Class of 2019)- 2019 Southwest Yosemite League unanimous MVP, 2019 California All-State 2nd team, former Bakersfield Renegades and San Francisco State Gators baseball player, current baseball player at Kansas Wesleyan Coyotes

References

Further reading

External links
Wallace, J. S. Recollections of a high school district, 1893–1968 : an informal history of the Kern County Union High School and junior college district.  Published circa 1980. 
Bakersfield High School
Driller Marching Band
Bakersfield Haunted History

Educational institutions established in 1893
High schools in Bakersfield, California
Public high schools in California
1893 establishments in California